010 may refer to:

 10 (number)
 8 (number) in octal numeral notation
 Motorola 68010, a microprocessor released by Motorola in 1982
 010, the telephone area code of Beijing 
 010, the Rotterdam area code
 010 (The Mad Capsule Markets album), 2001
 010 (Ulysses album), 2004
 Experiment 010, the codename for Felix, a fictional alien character in the Lilo & Stitch franchise